Liu Tingting is the name of:

Liu Tingting (hammer thrower) (born 1990), Chinese hammer thrower
Liu Tingting (rower) (born 1990), Chinese rower
Liu Tingting (gymnast) (born 2000), Chinese gymnast